Francisco David Grande Serrano (born 8 February 1991) is a Spanish professional footballer who plays as a forward for Calahorra.

References

External links

1991 births
Living people
Spanish footballers
Footballers from the Community of Madrid
Association football forwards
Segunda División B players
Primera Federación players
Tercera División players
CF Fuenlabrada footballers
Atlético Albacete players
Albacete Balompié players
Getafe CF B players
Algeciras CF footballers
Villarrubia CF players
UD Alzira footballers
CD Lealtad players
Club Recreativo Granada players
SD Ponferradina players
Atlético Malagueño players
Unionistas de Salamanca CF players
CD Calahorra players
Indian Super League players
Jamshedpur FC players
Spanish expatriate footballers
Expatriate footballers in India
Spanish expatriate sportspeople in India